Deinbollia is a genus of flowering plants belonging to the family Sapindaceae.

Its native range is tropical and Southern Africa and islands in the western Indian Ocean.

Its genus name of Deinbollia is in honour of Peter Vogelius Deinboll (1783–1874), a Danish-Norwegian priest, parliamentary representative and entomologist.

Known species:

Deinbollia acuminata 
Deinbollia angustifolia 
Deinbollia boinensis 
Deinbollia borbonica 
Deinbollia calophylla 
Deinbollia cauliflora 
Deinbollia crassipes 
Deinbollia cuneifolia 
Deinbollia dasybotrys 
Deinbollia evrardii 
Deinbollia fanshawei 
Deinbollia fulvotomentella 
Deinbollia gossweileri 
Deinbollia grandifolia 
Deinbollia hierniana 
Deinbollia insignis 
Deinbollia kilimandscharica 
Deinbollia laurentii 
Deinbollia laurifolia 
Deinbollia longiacuminata 
Deinbollia macrantha 
Deinbollia macrocarpa 
Deinbollia macroura 
Deinbollia maxima 
Deinbollia mezilii 
Deinbollia neglecta 
Deinbollia nyasica 
Deinbollia oblongifolia 
Deinbollia oreophila 
Deinbollia pervillei 
Deinbollia pinnata 
Deinbollia pycnophylla 
Deinbollia pynaertii 
Deinbollia rambaensis 
Deinbollia reticulata 
Deinbollia revoluta 
Deinbollia saligna 
Deinbollia unijuga 
Deinbollia xanthocarpa

References

Sapindaceae
Sapindaceae genera